Mike De Decker (born 15 December 1995) is a professional Belgian darts player who plays in Professional Darts Corporation (PDC) events.

Career

He won two PDC Development Tour events in 2015, followed by another one in 2016. He also won a PDC Tour Card in 2016.

After losing it at the end of 2017, De Decker went two years without a Tour Card, mainly playing on the Development and Challenge Tours and the odd European Tour. However, on 17 January 2020, he went all the way at European Q School to win back his Tour Card, beating Dennis Nilsson 5–3 in the final. He won his first World Championship match in the 2022 World Darts Championship, his opponent was Darius Labanauskas.

World Championship results

PDC
 2021: First round (lost to Edward Foulkes 0–3)
 2022: Second round (lost to Dave Chisnall 0–3)
 2023: Second round (lost to Mensur Suljovic 0–3)

Performance timeline

PDC European Tour

References

External links

1995 births
Living people
Belgian darts players
Professional Darts Corporation current tour card holders